The Bolshoy Ashap is a river in Perm Krai, Russia, a left tributary of Iren which in turn is a tributary of Sylva. Main tributaries: Bolshaya Rassokha (right).

References 

Rivers of Perm Krai